Zenobia is a 1761 opera by Johann Adolph Hasse, one of several based on Metastasio's libretto. It premiered for carnival in Vienna, and then in October performed in Warsaw.

Recording
Zenobia. (excerpts).  Władysław Kłosiewicz, Musicae Antiquae Collegium Varsoviense. PMC Pro Musica Camerata (Poland) 023. (1 CD 1997).

References

Operas